Truth and Beauty is the debut solo album of Ian McNabb, after he left the Icicle Works. The album peaked at No. 51 on the official UK charts. It was reissued in September 2013 as an expanded edition, including a second disc of B-sides.

Track listing
All songs written and arranged by Ian McNabb.
Truth and Beauty [International]
 "(I Go) My Own Way" (5:09)
 "These Are the Days" (4:29)
 "Great Dreams of Heaven" (5:07)
 "Truth and Beauty" (6:50)
 "I'm Game" (4:32)
 "If Love Was Like Guitars" (5:06)
 "Story of My Life" (3:17)
 "That's Why I Believe" (5:26)
 "Trip with Me" (3:48)
 "Make Love to You" (4:39)
 "Presence of the One" (11:58)

Personnel
Robert Ian McNabb - vocals, keyboards, guitars
Dave Baldwin - keyboards on "These are the Days"
Gordon Longworth - lead guitar on "If Love was Like Guitars", "Story of My Life" and "Presence of the One"
Roy Corkill - electric bass, drum and keyboard programming
Technical
Ken Nelson, Mark Phythian - mixing
Robert Shaw - cover photography

References

1993 debut albums
Ian McNabb albums